The 2012 European Table Tennis Championships was held in Herning, Denmark from 15–21 October 2012. Venue for the competition was Jyske Bank Boxen.

Medal summary

Men's events

Women's events

References

External links
Official website

2012
European Championships
International sports competitions hosted by Denmark
Table Tennis European Championships
Table tennis in Denmark
Sport in Herning
October 2012 sports events in Europe